Albert R. "Pete" Casey (December 2, 1895August 25, 1976), also known as Al Casey, was an American football player.  He played one season in the National Football League (NFL) as a halfback for the St. Louis All-Stars in 1923. He started all seven games at halfback for the 1923 All-Stars and scored two touchdowns. He received "honorable mention" recognition on the 1923 All-Pro Team.

References

1895 births
1976 deaths
People from Potosi, Missouri
Players of American football from Missouri
American football halfbacks
St. Louis All-Stars players